The Second Pramod Sawant Ministry came into existence on 28 March 2022. He was serving as the caretaker Chief Minister of Goa before being sworn in as Chief Minister.

Council of Ministers 

 As in March 2022

References

External links
 

Lists of current Indian state and territorial ministries
Bharatiya Janata Party state ministries
Maharashtrawadi Gomantak Party
Goa Forward Party
Pramod 2
Cabinets established in 2022
2022 establishments in Goa